The Tuen Mun District Council is the District Council of Tuen Mun District, in the New Territories. It is one of 18 such councils. The Council consists of 32 members with 31 of those elected through first past the post system every four years with 1 ex officio member who is the Tuen Mun Rural Committee chairman. The latest election was held on 24 November 2019.

History
The Tuen Mun District Council was established on 1 April 1981 under the name of the Tuen Mun District Board as the result of the colonial Governor Murray MacLehose's District Administration Scheme reform. The District Board was partly elected with the ex-officio Regional Council members and Tuen Mun Rural Committee chairman, as well as members appointed by the Governor until 1994 when last Governor Chris Patten refrained from appointing any member. Rural leaders and indigenous inhabitants like Lau Wong-fat had dominated local political scene in the early and mid-1980s.

The Tuen Mun District Board became Tuen Mun Provisional District Board after the Hong Kong Special Administrative Region (HKSAR) was established in 1997 with the appointment system being reintroduced by Chief Executive Tung Chee-hwa. The current Tuen Mun District Council was established on 1 January 2000 after the first District Council election in 1999. The appointed seats were abolished in 2015 after the modified constitutional reform proposal was passed by the Legislative Council in 2010.

As a new town in the 1980s, Tuen Mun was a strategic target for emerging pro-democracy activists, notably the Meeting Point. Ng Ming-yum was first elected in the 1985 election with the highest votes in the territory and was re-elected with high votes in 1988 and 1991 and later on elected to the Legislative Council in 1991. Another pro-democracy party Hong Kong Association for Democracy and People's Livelihood (ADPL) and pro-Taipei 123 Democratic Alliance also established their bases in the 1990s. In the 1994 election, the pro-democracy and pro-Taipei together gained the control of the council.

The Tuen Mun District Council is also dominated by the rural forces. Long-time Heung Yee Kuk chairman Lau Wong-fat was the long-time chairman of the council from 1985 up until 2011, and again from 2011 to 2015, on the capacity of Tuen Mun Rural Committee chairman. In 1994 when the pro-democrat and pro-Taipei councillors controlled the board, the 123 Democratic Alliance defected and elected Lau to be the chairman. Lau chairmanship was interrupted in 2011 when his rural committee chairmanship was taken away by Junius Ho. Leung Kin-man of the Democratic Alliance for the Betterment and Progress of Hong Kong (DAB), which rapidly developed its base in the district after the handover, took the chairmanship briefly and again became the council chairman since 2015.

The Democratic Party chairman Albert Ho was a long time councillor in the district, representing Lok Tsui, until he was defeated in the 2015 District Council election when he was ousted by Junius Ho, which eliminated Albert Ho's eligibility to run in the District Council (Second) constituency for the Legislative Council. The Democratic Party also suffered a huge defeat in the district, dropping their seats from seven to four.

Amid the massive pro-democracy protests in 2019, Junius Ho who was a key anti-protest figure who was allegedly involved in the Yuen Long attack was challenged by Democratic Party's Lo Chun-yu in his constituency in the November election, with Lo's party winning eight seats. A historic landslide victory occurred as the pro-democrats took 28 of the 31 seats in the council with Ho being unseated. A localist political group Tuen Mun Community Network also grabbed four seats as a result.

Political control
Since 1982 political control of the council has been held by the following parties:

Political makeup

Elections are held every four years.

District result maps

Members represented

Leadership

Chairs
Since 1985, the chairman is elected by all the members of the board:

Vice Chairs

Notes

References

External links
 Tuen Mun District Council

 
Districts of Hong Kong
Tuen Mun District